Broken (lit. "Hovering Blade" or "Roving Edge") is a 2014 South Korean action thriller film written and directed by Lee Jeong-ho. The film stars Jung Jae-young and Lee Sung-min in the lead roles. The narrative revolves around a father (played by Jung Jae-young) who becomes a fugitive as he hunts down the two men responsible for his daughter's rape and murder.

It is adapted from Keigo Higashino's 2004 novel . This is the third South Korean film adapted from the Japanese novelist's work, after White Night (2009) and Perfect Number (2012).

Plot
Widower Lee Sang-hyeon lives a quiet life with his 15-year-old daughter Su-jin. But one day she is abducted and raped, and her corpse is found at a derelict public bathhouse. Sang-hyeon is left helpless in the face of his daughter's death, with nothing left to cling on to but his feelings of anger and despair. The investigation into his daughter's death is progressing slowly, so restless and unable to sit quiet any longer, he decides to take matters into his own hands. Sang-hyeon receives an anonymous text message with information on the culprit, including an address where the sender claims Sang-hyeon would find electronic evidence of the crime; when he gets there, he sees a man, Kim Cheol-yong laughing as he watches a video showing Su-jin's rape and murder. Sang-hyeon accidentally kills Cheol-yong in a fit of rage, and upon learning that Cheol-yong had an accomplice, becomes hellbent on finding the second rapist/murderer. Upon examining Cheol-yong's murder scene, Jang Eok-gwan, the detective who leads the investigation into Su-jin's murder, realizes that Sang-hyeon was the killer and sets out on his trail.

Cast
Jung Jae-young - Lee Sang-hyeon
Lee Sung-min - Jang Eok-gwan 
Seo Jun-young - Park Hyeon-soo
Lee Soo-bin - Lee Su-jin
Lee Joo-seung - Jo Doo-sik 
Choi Sang-wook - Kim Min-ki 
Kim Ji-hyeok - Kim Cheol-yong 
Kim Hong-pa - Team leader Goo 
Kim Dae-myung -Yang Tae-seop 
Jung Suk-yong - Min-ki's father 
Park Myeong-shin - Min-ki's mother
Kim Hyun as Cheol-yong's mother 
Jo Yeon-ho - Cheol-yong's father 
Kim Seon-hwa - Mi-jin's mother 
Lee Joong-ok - Sang Hyun's section chief	
Oh Jung-se - Voice on the radio (cameo)

Box office

References

External links
  
 
 
 

2010s vigilante films
2014 action thriller films
South Korean action thriller films
South Korean vigilante films
Rape and revenge films
2014 films
Films based on Japanese novels
Films based on works by Keigo Higashino
South Korean films about revenge
2010s South Korean films